Sheed is a surname. Notable people with the surname include:

 Dom Sheed (born 1995), Australian rules footballer
 Frank Sheed (1897–1981), Australian Catholic apologist
 Jordan Sheed (born 1982), New Zealand cricketer
 Wilfrid Sheed (1930–2011), English-born American novelist